Nasser Al-Shamrani (born 23 November 1983) is a Saudi Arabian footballer who plays former the Saudi Arabia national team as a forward. Often considered one of the most versatile, effective Saudi Arabian strikers of all time, he won the Asian Footballer of the Year award in 2014.

Club career

Al-Wehda
Al-Shamrani began his professional career at the age of 20 playing with Al-Wehda's first team, in the 2003–04 season. He was young then, but along with his teammate Essa Al-Mehyani, was one of the main strikers at the club. Even though Al-Wehda had talented young strikers, they did not win any tournaments and the highest rank they achieved in the Saudi Premier League was 3rd place in the 2006–07 season.

Al-Shabab
During the 2005–06 season, Al-Shabab decided to try Al-Shamrani out, and a loan deal was agreed till the end of the season (Al-Wehda accepted because at that time they had no chance of competing in all of the local tournaments). During these couple of months, Al-Shamrani was able to prove his worth as a striker. He scored four goals in the AFC Champions League, which helped Al-Shabab reach the quarter-finals that year. In the league, he scored three goals, including the third in the Saudi Premier League final against Al-Hilal, which ended 3–0. After the end of the season, Al-Shabab were impressed by his performance, and tried sign a contract with him, but Al-Wehda refused and by the 2006–07 season he returned to Al-Wehda.

Al-Shamrani had one of his best seasons with Al-Wehda, scoring nine goals in the Saudi Premier League. He helped his team reach 3rd place in the league, though he did not score any goals in the golden play-off games against Al-Shabab and Al-Ittihad. By the end of the season, Al-Wehda went through financial problems. Al-Shabab soon noticed this and offered 13 million riyals for Al-Shamrani. Al-Wehda accepted, and Al-Shamrani moved to Al-Shabab by the beginning of the 2007–08 season, signing a five-year contract for 13 million riyals. 

Al-Shamrani's move to Al-Shabab was anticipated by many of their fans, but he began the season 'dry', without scoring any goal in the league. By the 6th round in the Saudi Premier League, he started his scoring with a hat-trick in Al-Qadisiya. He then scored continually in every game (1 goal against Al-Watani, 1 against Al-Nasr, 2 against Al-Ittihad, 1 against Al-Ta'ee, 1 against Al-Ahli, 1 against Al-Wehda, and 2 against Najran SC). He led the league goalscorers with 12 goals, but his former Al-Wehda teammate Eisa Al-Mehyani was closing the gap.   was able to score 13 goals, and also with 13 goals.

By the end of the season, Al-Shamrani had scored 18 goals with Al Shabab, and won the Saudi Premier League's top goal scorer award for the first time, ahead of Al-Mehyani and Al Hasan Al-Yami.

Al-Hilal
On 30 June 2013, Al-Shamrani agreed to a three-year deal with the 'club of the century' in Asia, Al-Hilal. After losing the 2014 Asian Champions League final, he spat at Western Sydney Wanderers player Matthew Spiranovic before attempting to headbutt him. As a result of his conduct, Al-Shamrani was handed an 8 match Champions League ban from the Asian Football Confederation.

Al Ain (loan)
In 2017, it was reported that Al-Shamrani had joined United Arab Emirates side Al Ain FC in a 2 million Dhs deal for a six-month loan contract. This was his first experience playing outside Saudi Arabia, and with one of the most successful clubs in Asia. In his third match against Al Ahli, he assisted a goal in minute 91 which helped Al Ain FC to win in the 'classico'.

Return to Al-Shabab
In summer 2017, he returned to Saudi Arabia and Al-Shabab.

Al-Ittihad
In 2019, he played for Al-Ittihad.

Al-Hidd
On 9 March 2021, Al-Shamrani joined Bahraini side Al-Hidd.

International career
On 30 December 2014, Al-Shamrani pushed a fan prior to Saudi Arabia's 4–1 loss to Bahrain and later missed the 2015 AFC Asian Cup due to "injury".

Personal life
His brother Mohammed Al Shamrani was also a footballer who played for Manama Club, where he was the top scorer of the 2012–13 season, and Saudi clubs including Al Raed.

Career statistics

Club

International
Source:

International goals
Scores and results list Saudi Arabia's goal tally first.
As of 14 January 2017

Honours

Club
Al-Shabab
Saudi Pro League: 2005–06, 2011–12
King Cup: 2008, 2009
Saudi Federation Cup: 2008–09, 2009–10

Al-Hilal
King Cup: 2015
Crown Prince Cup: 2015–16
Saudi Super Cup: 2015

Individual
Asian Footballer of the Year: 2014
Saudi Pro League top scorer: 2007–08, 2008–09, 2010–11, 2011–12, 2013–14

International
Saudi Arabia
Islamic Solidarity Games: 2005

References

External links

Living people
1985 births
Sportspeople from Mecca
Saudi Arabian footballers
Saudi Arabian expatriate footballers
Saudi Arabia international footballers
Association football forwards
Al-Wehda Club (Mecca) players
Al-Shabab FC (Riyadh) players
Al Hilal SFC players
Al Ain FC players
Ittihad FC players
Hidd SCC players
Saudi First Division League players
Saudi Professional League players
UAE Pro League players
Bahraini Premier League players
2007 AFC Asian Cup players
2011 AFC Asian Cup players
Asian Footballer of the Year winners
Expatriate footballers in the United Arab Emirates
Expatriate footballers in Bahrain
Saudi Arabian expatriate sportspeople in the United Arab Emirates
Saudi Arabian expatriate sportspeople in Bahrain